Anna Zay (b. 1680 - d.1733), was a Hungarian writer. She is regarded as a notable member of the early Hungarian baroque poetry. She came from Felvidék Evangelical Lutheran family to her father Baron András Zay (†1685) and her mother Baron Révay Krisztina.

18th-century Hungarian women writers
18th-century Hungarian poets
1733 deaths
1680 births
Hungarian women poets